United Nations Security Council Resolution 345, adopted on January 17, 1974, after a resolution from the General Assembly, the Council decided to expand the working languages of the Security Council to include Chinese.  Along with Chinese, the other four working languages of the Council were English, French, Russian and Spanish.

The resolution was adopted without vote.

See also
 List of United Nations Security Council Resolutions 301 to 400 (1971–1976)
 United Nations Security Council Resolution 263
 United Nations Security Council Resolution 528

References 
Text of the Resolution at undocs.org

External links
 

 0345
Language policy in the United Nations
Chinese language
 0345
January 1974 events